The 31st British Academy Film Awards, given by the British Academy of Film and Television Arts in 1978, honoured the best films of 1977.

Winners and nominees
BAFTA Fellowship: Fred Zinnemann

Statistics

See also
 50th Academy Awards
 3rd César Awards
 30th Directors Guild of America Awards
 35th Golden Globe Awards
 4th Saturn Awards
 30th Writers Guild of America Awards

References 

Film031
British Academy Film Awards
British Academy Film Awards
British Academy Film Awards
British Academy Film Awards